Dasia griffini, commonly known as Griffin's keel-scaled tree skink or Griffin's dasia, is a species of tree skink, a lizard in the family Scincidae. The species is endemic to central and northern Palawan and southern Mindoro in the Philippines.

Etymology
The specific name, griffini, is in honor of American herpetologist Lawrence Edmonds Griffin (1874-1949).

Behavior and habitat
Dasia griffini is an arboreal lizard. It inhabits dipterocarp primary forests. More rarely, it is also found in coastal forests and scrubland.

Taxonomy
Dasia griffini belongs to the genus Dasia. It is classified under the subfamily Mabuyinae of the skink family Scincidae.

Conservation status
Dasia griffini is threatened by logging activities in its habitats.

See also
List of threatened species of the Philippines

References

Further reading
Taylor EH. (1915). "New Species of Philippine Lizards". Philippine J. Sci. 10: 89-109 + Plate I. (Dasia griffini, new species, p. 104 + Plate I, figures 5 & 6).

griffini
Endemic fauna of the Philippines
Reptiles of the Philippines
Fauna of Palawan
Fauna of Mindoro
Reptiles described in 1915
Taxa named by Edward Harrison Taylor